Closer to Home is the third studio album by American rock band Grand Funk Railroad. The album was released on June 15, 1970, by Capitol Records. Recorded at Cleveland Recording Company, the album was produced by Terry Knight. This album reached RIAA gold record status in 1970, making it the group's third gold record in one year. The album's inside artwork shows a live photo of the band performing at Madison Square Garden in February 1970.

In 2002 Closer to Home was remastered on compact disc with bonus tracks and also released in a limited-edition box set Trunk of Funk that contained the band's first four albums. The "trunk" has slots for twelve CDs to house the future release of the remaining eight albums that were released by Capitol. Also included is a pair of "Shinin' On" 3-D glasses, guitar pick and a sticker reproducing a concert ticket.

Track listing
All songs written by Mark Farner.

Personnel
 Mark Farner – guitar, keyboards, vocals
 Mel Schacher – bass guitar
 Don Brewer – drums, vocals

Charts
Album

Singles

References

1970 albums
Grand Funk Railroad albums
Albums produced by Terry Knight
Capitol Records albums